Nebraska Highway 121 is a highway in northeastern Nebraska.  It is a discontinuous highway with three segments:
 The southern segment begins at Nebraska Highway 32 west of Madison and ends at U.S. Highway 275 north of Battle Creek.
 The middle segment begins at Nebraska Highway 13 northwest of Pierce and ends at Nebraska Highway 84 north of Wausa.
 The northern segment begins at Nebraska Highway 12 in Crofton and ends at U.S. Highway 81 northeast of Crofton, near the South Dakota border.

Route description

Southern segment
The southern segment of Nebraska Highway 121 begins at an intersection with NE 32 west of Madison. It heads in a northward direction through farmland, passing through Battle Creek.

Middle segment
The middle segment of Nebraska Highway 121 begins at NE 13 northwest of Pierce. It heads in a northward direction through farmland, where it intersects with US 20 in Osmond. It then intersects NE 59 before entering Wausa to the north. The highway turns to the east and then northward again as it passes through Wausa.

Northern segment
The third segment of Nebraska Highway 121 begins at NE 12 in Crofton.  It heads northward from Crofton through farmland, passing by the Lewis and Clark State Recreation Area and Gavins Point Dam.  At that point, the highway turns to the northeast and finally directly eastward.  It meets with US 81 south of the South Dakota border and just a couple of miles south of Yankton.  NE 121 terminates at US 81.

Major intersections

References

External links

The Nebraska Highways Page: Highways 101 to 300
Nebraska Roads: NE 121-192

121
Transportation in Madison County, Nebraska
Transportation in Pierce County, Nebraska
Transportation in Knox County, Nebraska
Transportation in Cedar County, Nebraska